Matsatu Creek, historically called the Matsatu River, is a stream in the Northern Interior of British Columbia, Canada. From its head at Level Mountain, where it has cut a large gorge into its western escarpment, Matsatu Creek flows northwest into Kakuchuya Creek, the main tributary of the Dudidontu River.

Matsatu Creek flows very close to the upper reach of the Koshin River.

References

External links

Rivers of British Columbia
Level Mountain
Nahlin Plateau